A list of films produced by the Israeli film industry in 1963.

1963 releases

See also
1963 in Israel

References

External links
 Israeli films of 1963 at the Internet Movie Database

Israeli
Film
1963